Hungary competed at the 2022 Winter Paralympics in Beijing, China which took place between 4–13 March 2022.

Competitors
The following is the list of number of competitors participating at the Games per sport/discipline.

Alpine skiing

Richard Dumity competed in alpine skiing.

See also
Hungary at the Paralympics
Hungary at the 2022 Winter Olympics

References

Nations at the 2022 Winter Paralympics
2022
Winter Paralympics